Carrs Station is an unincorporated community in Hancock County, in the U.S. state of Georgia.

History
A post office called Carrs Station was established in 1874, and remained in operation until 1950. A variant name was "Carrs". The community most likely was named after J. D. Carr, a local merchant and railroad employee.

References

Unincorporated communities in Hancock County, Georgia
Unincorporated communities in Georgia (U.S. state)